Pseudostomatella orbiculata is a species of sea snail, a marine gastropod mollusk in the family Trochidae, the top snails.

Description

Distribution
This marine species is found in raised beach deposits off the Algoa Bay along the South African east coast.

References

Endemic fauna of South Africa
orbiculata
Gastropods described in 1850